The Burkina Faso national rugby union team represents Burkina Faso in international rugby union. Burkina Faso have yet to play in a Rugby World Cup tournament. 

They compete in the north section of the CAR Development Trophy. The national coaches are Ahmed Coulibaly and Laurent Stravato.

Record

Overall

References

See also
 Rugby union in Burkina Faso

African national rugby union teams
Rugby union in Burkina Faso
National sports teams of Burkina Faso